Pondhvadi is a village in the Karmala taluka of Solapur district in Maharashtra state, India.

Demographics
Covering  and comprising 356 households at the time of the 2011 census of India, Pondhvadi had a population of 1774. There were 928 males and 846 females, with 242 people being aged six or younger.

References

Villages in Karmala taluka